The Thomas Richards House is a historic home located at Rising Sun, Cecil County, Maryland, United States. It is a stone and brick farmhouse; the -story kitchen section of fieldstone construction dating from the late 18th century, and the main block of brick construction, dating from the early 19th century. Also on the property is a large stone and wood three-level bank barn.

The Thomas Richards House was listed on the National Register of Historic Places in 1979.

References

External links
, including photo from 1968, Maryland Historical Trust

Houses in Cecil County, Maryland
Houses on the National Register of Historic Places in Maryland
National Register of Historic Places in Cecil County, Maryland